Julie Harvey is a former association football player who represented New Zealand at international level.  Harvey made her Football Ferns début in a 3–0 win over Switzerland on 14 October 1981, and finished her international career with five caps to her credit.

References

Year of birth missing (living people)
Living people
New Zealand women's international footballers
New Zealand women's association footballers
Women's association footballers not categorized by position